Aijaz Ahmad (1941 – 9 March 2022) was an Indian-born American Marxist philosopher, literary theorist, and political commentator. He was the Chancellor's Professor at the University of California, Irvine School of Humanities’ Department of Comparative Literature.

Early life, family and education

Aijaz Ahmad was born in Muzaffarnagar, British Raj in 1941.

Career
He was a professorial fellow at the Centre of Contemporary Studies, Nehru Memorial Museum and Library, New Delhi, India, visiting professor at the Centre for Political Studies, Jawaharlal Nehru University, New Delhi, and visiting professor of political science at York University, Toronto, Canada. He also worked as an editorial consultant with the Frontline and as a senior news analyst for the news website Newsclick.

Work
In his book In Theory: Classes, Nations, Literatures, Ahmad primarily discusses the role of theory and theorists in the movement against colonialism and imperialism.

Personal life

Ahmad died in Irvine, California, on 9 March 2022, at age 81. He was hospitalised for age-related ailments and had returned home only a few days prior to his death. Rutgers University law professor Adil Ahmad Haque is his son.

Bibliography
In Theory: Classes, Nations, Literatures - Verso, 1992. 
 A World To Win: Essays on the Communist Manifesto - with Irfan Habib and Prabhat Patnaik, LeftWord Books, 1999. 
Lineages of the Present:  Ideological and Political Genealogies of Contemporary South Asia - Verso, 2001. 
On Communalism and Globalization: Offensives of the Far Right - Three Essays Collective, New Delhi, 2002. 
Iraq, Afghanistan and the Imperialism of Our Time - LeftWord Books, New Delhi, 2004. 
In Our Time: Empire, Politics, Culture - Verso, 2007

Edited
 Ghazals of Ghalib - ed. by Aijaz Ahmad. Oxford India, 1995. (With translations from the Urdu by Aijaz Ahmed, W.S. Merwin, Adrienne Rich, William Stafford, David Ray, Thomas Fitzsimmons, Mark Strand, and William Hunt)
A Singular Voice: Collected Writings of Michael Sprinker - Editor (with Fred Pfeil and Modhumita Roy), 2000.

References

External links
 On Post Modernism, The Marxist XXVII, January–March 2011. 
Nationalism and Globalization, Occasional Paper Series 4, Department of Sociology, University of Pune, 2000. 
 Communalisms: Changing Forms and Fortunes
 Jameson's Rhetoric of Otherness and the "National Allegory", Social Text, 1987 (On Fredric Jameson's article "Third-world Literature in the Era of Multinational Capital", 1986)
 Video. Aijaz Ahmad interviewed by Tariq Ali for The World Today. Part 1 and Part 2.

1941 births
2022 deaths
Indian communists
Pakistani communists
20th-century Pakistani historians
Literary theorists
Indian Marxist writers
Pakistani Marxists
Marxist theorists
Urdu-language writers
Urdu critics
Pakistani expatriates in India
Muhajir people
Pakistani expatriates in Canada
Pakistani emigrants to the United States
People from Muzaffarnagar
21st-century Pakistani historians